The Oakes Estate is located in Bloomfield, Essex County, New Jersey, United States. The building, designed by Charles Granville Jones was built in 1895, was added to the National Register of Historic Places on August 6, 1981.

See also
National Register of Historic Places listings in Essex County, New Jersey

References

Bloomfield, New Jersey
Houses on the National Register of Historic Places in New Jersey
Queen Anne architecture in New Jersey
Colonial Revival architecture in New Jersey
Houses completed in 1895
Houses in Essex County, New Jersey
National Register of Historic Places in Essex County, New Jersey
New Jersey Register of Historic Places